Edgar Podmore (20 April 1918 – 1987) was an English footballer who played in the Football League for Crewe Alexandra.

Career
Podmore was born in Stoke-on-Trent and joined Stoke City during World War II. He played once in 1943–44 and six times in 1944–45. He spent two seasons in the club's reserves before joining Crewe Alexandra in 1947. He played one match for Crewe.

Career statistics
Source:

References

1918 births
1987 deaths
English footballers
Stoke City F.C. players
Crewe Alexandra F.C. players
English Football League players
Association football goalkeepers